Barnes is an unincorporated community in McLean County, Illinois.

History 
Calvin Barnes found the community in the 1880's, originally naming it "Barnesville." Barnes' home was the first structure built, followed by a grain elevator.  Barnes had a post office open in 1884 that stayed in operation until 1919. Walter and Alta Weber opened a general store in 1921. The small community was layed out along the Illinois Central, northeast of Bloomington-Normal. Hopeful planning resulted in four streets and over 20 commercial lots. However, the population never even grew to double digits. Only a few of the elevator structures remain.

References

Unincorporated communities in Illinois
Unincorporated communities in McLean County, Illinois